Joseph Ambrose Stapf (1785, in Fließ – 1844, in Brixen ) was an Austrian Catholic theologian.

He studied theology at Innsbruck, and in 1823 was named professor of moral theology and pedagogy at the seminary in Brixen.

Works
 Theologia moralis in compendium redacta (1827–30)
 Epitome theologiæ moralis publicis prælectionibus accommodata (1832)
 Erziehungslehre im Geiste der katholischen Kirche (1832)
 Expositio casuum reservatorum in diocesi Brixinensi (1836)
 Der hl. Vincentius von Paul, dargestellt in seinem Leben und Wirken (1837)
 Die christliche Sittenlehre (1848–49)

References

1785 births
1844 deaths
19th-century Austrian Roman Catholic theologians
People from Landeck District